Lemonade is a 2018 Romanian drama film directed by Ioana Uricaru. It was screened in the Panorama section at the 68th Berlin International Film Festival. The Romanian-Canadian co-production, set in Upstate New York, was shot in Montreal.

Cast
 Mălina Manovici as Mara
 Dylan Smith as Daniel
 Steve Bacic as Moji
 Milan Hurduc as Dragos
 Ruxandra Maniu as Aniko

References

External links
 

2018 films
2018 drama films
Romanian drama films
English-language Romanian films
2010s English-language films